Lucas Maximiliano Sánchez (born 25 January 1994) is an Argentine footballer who plays as a midfielder. He is currently a free agent.

Career
Sánchez started his career in the system of Atlético Tucumán. He was moved into the senior side in 2013, subsequently making his professional debut during a 1–0 defeat to Douglas Haig on 17 June. His next appearance for the club arrived on 9 April 2014 as Atlético Tucumán were eliminated from the Copa Argentina by Ferro Carril Oeste. In 2016, Sánchez participated nine times for Vélez Sarsfield in Torneo Federal B.

Career statistics
.

References

External links

1994 births
Living people
Sportspeople from San Miguel de Tucumán
Argentine footballers
Association football midfielders
Primera Nacional players
Atlético Tucumán footballers